Live from the Underground is the debut studio album by American rapper and record producer Big K.R.I.T. It was released on June 5, 2012, by Cinematic Music Group and Def Jam Recordings. As one of the executive producers on the album, Big K.R.I.T. did the production work for the entirety of the project. The album was supported by four singles: "Money on the Floor", "I Got This", "Yeah Dat's Me" and "What U Mean".

Critical reception

Live from the Underground received generally positive reviews from critics. At Metacritic, which assigns a normalized rating out of 100 to reviews from mainstream publications, the album received an average score of 78, based on 23 reviews.

Adam Fleischer of XXL praised Big K.R.I.T. for maintaining his "traditionalist Southern aesthetic" and "nuanced sociopolitical themes" from his mixtapes and giving the tracks "a grounded sonic variety" of "sounds [are] individually diverse but complementary on the whole", concluding that: "In a time of formulaic approaches to club and radio hits, Big K.R.I.T. is navigating a space of bluesy Southern hip-hop like no artist in recent memory. With Live from the Underground, through deeply authentic takes on his own life and surroundings, the 2011 XXL Freshman has found a way to create some of the most resonating, least selfish rap music around." Kyle Anderson of Entertainment Weekly wrote that: "With its feral lyrical hunger and playful production, Live From the Underground is the best distillation of the South since OutKast's rule-rewriting heyday." AllMusic's David Jeffries gave praise to K.R.I.T. for "keeping quality control at top level" on his debut album by crafting "impeccable" beats and having a "precise and commanding" flow that sells "his exploration of major-label life ("I Got This", "My Sub")" while also delivering "some surprising pop experiments ("If I Fall", "Praying Man"), concluding that: "Live from the Underground winds up both an easy introduction to the man's talents and a crowd-pleasing effort with no stale sell-out aftertaste. He could have gone deeper, but this is certainly deep enough."

Spin named Live from the Underground the eleventh best hip hop album of 2012.

Commercial performance
Live from the Underground debuted at number five on the US Billboard 200, with first-week sales of 41,000 copies in the United States. As of August 2012, the album sold 83,000 copies in the United States.

Track listing 

All tracks produced by Big K.R.I.T.

Personnel
Credits for Live from the Underground adapted from AllMusic. 

2 Chainz – vocals
8Ball – vocals
Ian Allen – music business affairs
Eric Bailey – art direction, design, illustrations
Chris Bellman – mastering
Big K.R.I.T. – engineer, mixing, primary artist, producer
Big Sant – vocals
Eric Bisgyer – assistant engineer
C. Bridges (Ludacris) – composer, vocals
Mike Brown – vocal engineer
Leesa D. Brunson – A&R
Ralph Cacciurri – engineer, mixing
D. Copeland (Devin the Dude) – composer, vocals
Vol S. Davis III – music business affairs
Steven Defino – design producer
Andre Drizza – engineer
Chris Ebbert – assistant
Alex Eremin – assistant engineer
Tasha Evans – vocals (background)
Melanie Fiona – vocals
B. Freeman (Bun B) – composer, vocals
M. Goodwin (MJG) – composer, vocals
Tina Guo – cello
Anthony Hamilton – vocals
Keyon Harrold – flugelhorn, horn arrangements, trumpet
Mike Hartnett – bass, guitar

Tony Hightower – vocals (background)
Crystal Holy – vocals (background)
Billy Hume – engineer, guitar, mixing
W. Hutch – composer
Marjoriea Jacobs – vocals (background)
James Kang – assistant engineer
Martin Kearns – keyboards
Brian Kee – assistant engineer
B.B. King – vocals, guitar
Jason Kingsland – engineer
Tai Linzie – art producer
Ms. Linnie – vocals
Pat Postlewait – bass
L. Richie – composer
Tacara Roberts – vocals
Kathy Rodriguez-Harrold – horn arrangements, sax (alto), sax (tenor)
Sha Money XL – A&R, executive producer
Jonny Shipes – A&R, executive producer
DJ Wally Sparks – A&R, scratching, vocals
Steve-O – marketing
Mark Tavern – A&R
Antoinette Trotman – music business affairs
Va$htie – vocals
Lamar Williams – vocals (background)
Tom Wolf – harmonica
Nicole Wyskoarko – music business affairs

Charts

Weekly charts

Year-end charts

References

2012 debut albums
Big K.R.I.T. albums
Def Jam Recordings albums
Hip hop albums by American artists
Albums produced by Big K.R.I.T.
Cinematic Music Group albums